Makineh-ye Khar Farih (also Romanized as Makīneh-ye Khar Farīḥ) is a village in Abdoliyeh-ye Sharqi Rural District, in the Central District of Ramshir County, Khuzestan Province, Iran. At the 2006 census, its population was 46, in 6 families.

References 

Populated places in Ramshir County